Applied Organometallic Chemistry is a monthly peer-reviewed scientific journal published since 1987 by John Wiley & Sons. 
The editor-in-chief is Cornelis J. Elsevier (University of Amsterdam).

Contents
The journal includes: 
 reviews
 full papers
 communications
 working methods papers
 crystallographic reports

It also includes occasional reports on: 
 relevant conferences of applied work in the field of organometallics
 including bioorganometallic chemistry
 metal/organic ligand coordination chemistry.

Abstracting and indexing
The journal is abstracted and indexed in:
 
 Biological Abstracts
 BIOSIS Previews
 Cambridge Structural Database
 Chemical Abstracts Service
 Ceramic Abstracts
 ChemWeb
 Compendex
 Advanced Polymer Abstracts
 Civil Engineering Abstracts
 Mechanical & Transportation Engineering Abstracts
 Current Contents/Physical
 Chemical & Earth Sciences
 Engineered Materials Abstracts
 International Aerospace Abstracts
 METADEX
 PASCAL
 Science Citation Index
 Scopus

According to the Journal Citation Reports, the journal has a 2020 impact factor of 4.105.

Most cited papers
The three highest cited papers (> 250 citations each) are:

References

External links

Organic chemistry journals
Wiley (publisher) academic journals
Publications established in 1987
English-language journals
Monthly journals